The 2022–23 Swiss Super League (referred to as the Credit Suisse Super League for sponsoring reasons) is the 126th season of top-tier competitive football in Switzerland and the 20th under its current name and format. With this season, the Swiss Super League became the longest continuously running top-flight national league.

Overview 
A total of ten teams are competing in the league: nine teams of the previous season will participate in the league again. FC Lausanne-Sport, who came in last place, were relegated and are replaced by the 2021–22 Swiss Challenge League champions Winterthur. Luzern remains in the league as the winner of the Relegation/Promotion playoff. Zürich are the defending champions.

After Swiss teams gained 7.75 points in European championships in the 2021–22 season, the Swiss Football Association jumped five spots in the UEFA association ranking to rank 14, granting them five spots in European championships in the 2023–24 season. This means that first and second ranked teams of the 2022–23 season will participate in the third and second rounds of the 2023–24 UEFA Champions League qualification, respectively, while the third and fourth enter the second round of the 2023–24 UEFA Europa Conference League qualification. Furthermore, the champion of the 2022-23 Swiss Cup enters the third qualification round for the 2023–24 UEFA Europa League.

Due to the format change and the increased number of teams starting with the 2023–24 Swiss Super League, this season will function as a transition season. As a result, no teams will be directly relegated to the 2023–24 Swiss Challenge League. Instead the last-placed team will play a relegation playoff against the third team of the 2022–23 Swiss Challenge League.

Schedule 
The playing schedule of the season, as well as dates and times for the first nine matchdays were announced on 17 June 2022. The first matchday would be held on the weekend of 16 and 17 July 2022. However, the first round match Luzern – Grasshoppers is postponed until 10 August 2022, due to lack of venues. The match Luzern – Basel, originally scheduled for 31 July 2022 (Matchday 3), is also postponed to 9 November 2022. Furthermore, scheduled dates for champion Zürich for matchdays 4, 5, and 8 may be swapped subject to their Champions League qualifier schedule.

The exact schedule for matchdays 10 through 18 were announced on 2 September 2022. Due to the 2022 FIFA World Cup, which will be held in November and December 2022, the league will go on a two-month break, after matchday 16 on 13 November 2022. The winter break will thus occur two rounds earlier than usual, with matchdays 17 and 18 to be held in January 2023. On 22 November 2022, fixtures of matchdays 19 through 27 were scheduled. Matchdays 28 through 36 were scheduled on 15 March 2023.

The last matchday will be on 29 May 2023. The Relegation Play-off will be played during the week after the last matchday.

Teams

Stadia and locations

Personnel and kits

Managerial changes

League table

Results

First and second rounds

Third and fourth rounds

Relegation play-off 
The relegation play-off will be played in a two-legged game between the last place team of the Super League and the third placed team of the Challenge League. The games will be held in the week following the final matchday (29 May 2023).

Statistics

Top goalscorers

Hat-tricks

Top assists

Awards

Best Player

Player of the Round 
The best player of the Super League and Challenge League for each matchday is voted for by the viewers from among a selection of players.

Player of the Month 
The best player of the month in the Super League and Challenge League is chosen by the viewers from among five nominees. The following table shows the winner (in dark grey) and the other nominees for each month where a Player of the Month was chosen.

Overall

References

External links 
Official website
uefa.com
soccerway.com

Swiss Super League seasons
2022–23 in Swiss football
Swit
Switzerland